Gilardoni is a surname. Notable people with the surname include:

 Daniele Gilardoni (born 1976), Italian lightweight rower
 Domenico Gilardoni (1798–1831), Italian opera librettist
 Eduardo Gilardoni (born 1935), Uruguayan composer and musician 
 Henri Gilardoni (1876–1937), French sailor
 Marina Gilardoni (born 1987), Swiss skeleton racer